The 1972 Australian Touring Car Championship was a CAMS sanctioned national motor racing title open to Group C Improved Production Touring Cars and Group E Series Production Touring Cars. The championship, which was the 13th running of the Australian Touring Car Championship, began at Symmons Plains and ended at Oran Park after eight rounds.

1972 would be the final time the Improved Production cars would contest the ATCC. From 1973, CAMS introduced a new production based Group C touring car formula. Outright cars like the Ford Mustangs, Chevrolet Camaros, Norm Beechey's Holden Monaro and Ian Geoghegan's Ford XY Falcon GTHO Phase III would be replaced with production based Ford Falcons and Holden Toranas. Many Improved Production cars would end up racing as Sports Sedans in the following years.

Defending champion Bob Jane won his fourth and final Australian Touring Car Championship in his Chevrolet Camaro ZL-1. Unlike 1971 when Jane's Camaro used the 7.0 litre 427 V8 engine, CAMS rule changes reducing the engine capacity limit to 6000cc him forced to run the 5.7 litre 350 V8. Second in the championship was the Ford Escort Twin Cam Mk.1 of Mike Stillwell whose consistent placings in the under 2.0 litre class saw him finish 11 points behind Jane. Third was Allan Moffat in his Ford Boss 302 Mustang.

Although he was not classified after not scoring a point, the 1972 championship saw Peter Brock make his ATCC debut driving a Holden LJ Torana GTR XU-1 for Harry Firth's Holden Dealer Team.

Teams and drivers
The following drivers competed in the 1972 Australian Touring Car Championship.

Calendar
The 1972 Australian Touring Car Championship was contested over an eight-round series with one race per round.

Classes
Cars competed in two engine capacity classes:
 Up to and including 2000cc
 Over 2000cc

Points system
Championship points were awarded on a 9-6-4-3-2-1 basis for the first six placings in each class at each round.
In addition, points were awarded on a 4-3-2-1 basis for the first four outright placings, irrespective of class, at each round.
The title was awarded to the driver gaining the highest total of points in any seven of the eight rounds.

Championship standings

Notes and references

External links
 1972 Australian Touring Car racing images at www.autopics.com.au
 1972 Australian Touring Car Championship race results at www.toranagtrxu-1.com

Australian Touring Car Championship seasons
Touring Cars